The 2015 ITF Women's Circuit is the 2015 edition of the second tier tour for women's professional tennis. It is organised by the International Tennis Federation and is a tier below the WTA Tour. The ITF Women's Circuit includes tournaments with prize money ranging from $10,000 up to $100,000.

Key

Month

October

November

December

External links 
 International Tennis Federation (ITF)

 4